Bernard Spolsky (born in New Zealand in 1932; died in Israel August 20, 2022) was a professor emeritus in linguistics at Bar-Ilan University (Israel), specializing in sociolinguistics, educational linguistics, and applied linguistics.

Spolsky did his studies at Wellington College and Victoria University. He received a Ph.D. in linguistics from the University of Montreal.

Spolsky's works are related to language testing, second language learning, computers in the humanities, applied linguistics, sociolinguistics, and language policy.

References 

Linguists from Israel
1932 births
Living people
Academic staff of Bar-Ilan University
Sociolinguists
Université de Montréal alumni
Victoria University of Wellington alumni
Fellows of the Linguistic Society of America